Almost Human is a 1974 Italian poliziotteschi film directed by Umberto Lenzi. This film stars Tomas Milian, Henry Silva, Ray Lovelock and Anita Strindberg.

Plot
A bunch of thieves kidnap a boy in a red hoodie from his mother's arms. This is followed by an action-packed car chase full of breaking boxes, defacing cars, and slim getaways. The chase ends when the kidnappers are saved by an oncoming train, which cuts off the police from their trail. They find this a perfect opportunity to dump the kid and make their getaway. The boy is returned to his family but the kidnappers' gang beat them up for their failure.

Following a castration threat, the kidnapper/thief goes home to rape his girlfriend. Following this, he robs a cigarette dispenser and stabs the beat cop who catches him. This leads to a detective to start asking questions. The following day, while the thief is picking up his aforementioned girlfriend from her office, he notices the young brown-haired daughter of his girlfriend's boss, and decides to kidnap her. After a love-making session with his girlfriend in her apartment, the kidnapper leaves to find his friend and convinces him to join his plan. We are shown how tough a cop the detective is through a cut scene. The protagonist (kidnapper) and his gang start stalking the girl while she's playing tennis with her father and his friends. Using his girlfriend's stolen red car, the thieves go buy guns from an old confidant ("Papa") of theirs. The guns are worth 100 thousand lira each and, if they kill someone, their confidant keeps their deposit. Not wanting to pay their confidant the deposit, they murder Papa and his staff, and make their escape.

They then catch up with their target while she is discussing her future with the boy she wants to marry in his car in the middle of a forest. Her boyfriend shows his reluctance to marry her unless she refuses her inheritance on the basis of principle. The girl refuses and starts making out with her boyfriend against his will. The kidnappers then attack and kidnap her and murder her boyfriend. However, the girl then escapes into the forest until she reaches a bungalow where she is taken in, and the family agree to protect her. The bad guys break in nevertheless, murdering everyone, including a young child, and run off with the girl, who they stash in an abandoned ship yard. After returning his girlfriend's car to her, he murders her by drowning and disposes of her car.

During all this, the inspector gets a lead when three bad guys make a ransom call and ask for "No Police interference". While posting a ransom letter that they had forced the girl to write, one of the thieves realizes the cops have discovered the murder of the daughter of his girlfriend's boss. The cops conclude all the murders and thefts were by the same gang. Deducing the kidnappers knew the girlfriend, the cops decide to visit her apartment. The protagonist notices this and follows them back to his own apartment and sees them discover his connection to the whole mess. Scared, he calls his acquaintance, the guy who had beat him up, and asks for a deal. He then goes to the police and acts innocent to throw off suspicion from himself. When he and the detective visit the acquaintance, he covers for his "friend", and then threatens the kidnapper with castration again.

After the cops start closing in on him, the protagonist goes insane and murders the hostage (the girl), a shoot-out ensues, and only the protagonist survives. He runs off to hide, but the detective finds him the next day and shoots him in the head.

Cast
Tomas Milian: Giulio Sacchi
Henry Silva: Inspector Walter Grandi
Laura Belli: Marilù Porrino (Mary Lou in English)
Anita Strindberg: Ione Tucci
Ray Lovelock: Carmine
Gino Santercole: Vittorio
Luciano Catenacci Ugo Maione
Guido Alberti: Commendator Porrino
Lorenzo Piani: Gianni  
Pippo Starnazza: "Papà"
Tom Felleghy: Judge Rossi

Production
When production began, director Umberto Lenzi offered the role of Giulio Sacchi to actor Marc Porel. After an unpleasant meeting with the actor, Lenzi found him to be "unreliable from both a human and professional point of view." Lenzi would not do the film if Porel was cast and he told the producer "It's him or me." The producer suggested Tomas Milian, who had appeared in numerous Spaghetti Westerns. Lenzi admits that his first meeting with Milian was difficult; Milian had heard that he was an "impulsive, hot-headed director." Despite the stories Milian felt Lenzi was the right person for the job. This would begin what Lenzi has called a love–hate relationship between the two that would continue for six more films.

American actor Richard Conte was originally cast as Commissario Walter Grandi, but Conte dropped out of the production and Henry Silva was cast in his place. Lenzi states that he worked hard to have Silva fit the role of a tough cop because Silva was more tailored to play villainous roles.

Releases
Almost Human was released on 8 August 1974. Its domestic gross was 1,168,745,000 lire. In America, Joseph Brenner Associates acquired the film, and after some editing, initially released it in 1975 as The Kidnap of Mary Lou, followed by another attempt in 1976 under the title The Death Dealer, and then once more in 1980 under its best known title of Almost Human.

Home Video
Almost Human was released on home video in the United States in the early 1980s. On home video, the film was promoted as a horror film due to Lenzi's fame as a director of films such as Cannibal Ferox and Eaten Alive!

The film was released on Region 0 NTSC DVD by NoShame films in 2005. The DVD is currently out-of-print. In 2018, it was released on BluRay in the United States by Code Red, with both the international edit and Joseph Brenner's shorter edit offered on the disc.

It has also been released on DVD in Italy by Alan Young Pictures and in the United Kingdom by Shameless Screen Entertainment.

Reception
On its initial release, Almost Human was unanimously condemned by Italian film critics as fascist and reactionary.

Notes

References

External links

  Film locations in Milan

1974 films
1970s Italian-language films
1970s crime thriller films
1970s action thriller films
Poliziotteschi films
Films directed by Umberto Lenzi
1970s serial killer films
Films set in Milan
Films scored by Ennio Morricone
Films with screenplays by Ernesto Gastaldi
1970s Italian films